The canton of Vichy-1 is an administrative division of the Allier department, in central France. It was created at the French canton reorganisation which came into effect in March 2015. Its seat is in Vichy.

Composition

Geographic boundaries 
The geography of the canton of Vichy-1 is composed of:

 Three communes in their entirety: Charmeil, Saint-Germain-des-Fossés, and Saint-Rémy-en-Rollat.
 The part of the commune of Vichy situated to the north of line defined by the axis of the roads and boundaries as follows: from the territorial limit of the municipality of Cusset, allée Mesdames, rue d'Alsace, rue du Champ-de-Foire, place Jean-Epinat (west side), boulevard de la Mutualité, place Pierre-Victor-Léger, rue du 11-Novembre, rue Beauparlant, rue de Paris, rue Lucas, avenue du Général-Dwight-Eisenhower, rue du Parc, rue du Casino, boulevard de Russie, boulevard des Etats-Unis, its extension in a straight line from rue de Belgique to the edge of the Allier.

References

Cantons of Allier